The Matarranya is a river in the provinces of Teruel and Zaragoza, Aragon, Spain. It begins its course at 1,200 m northeast of the Tossal d'Encanader, Ports de Beseit. limestone massif near La Pobla de Benifassà.

The Matarranya flows roughly from south to north into the Ebro (Ebre), 4 km east of Faió (Fayón). This river gives its name to the Matarranya Catalan language-speaking comarca of Aragon.

Tributaries
 From the left:
 Algars River
 Ulldemó River
 Barranc de Calapatar
 From the right:
 De Pena River
 Tastavins River

See also
Ports de Beseit
Matarraña/Matarranya comarca

References

External links
Turismo de Aragon 
Matarranya Tourism
Interpreting avulsion process from ancient alluvial sequences: Guadalope-Matarranya system (northern Spain) and Wasatch Formation (western Colorado)
Map of the river within the historical comarca
Effect of floods of different magnitude on the macroinvertebrate communities of Matarranya stream (Ebro river basin, NE Spain)
Microhabitat Use in a Mediterranean Riverine Fish Assemblage - Fishes of the Upper Matarranya

Rivers of Spain
Rivers of Aragon